Gregory House is the main character of the American television series House.

Gregory House also may refer to the following structures:
Please note: U.S. sites listed on the National Register of Historic Places (NRHP) are distinguished by the county (as well as the state) within which their respective locations lie.

 Structures in Arkansas
 Gregory House (Augusta, Arkansas), Augusta, Arkansas, (NRHP) in Woodruff County
 Wilson-Pittman-Campbell-Gregory House, Fayetteville, Arkansas, (NRHP) in Washington County
 William J. Gregory House, Westminster, Colorado, (NRHP) in Adams County
 Structures in Florida:
 Willoughby Gregory House, Quincy, Florida, (NRHP) in Gadsden County
 Gregory House at Torreya State Park, in Florida
 Judge Henry F. Gregory House, Vero Beach, Florida, (NRHP) in Indian River County
 Structures in Kentucky:
 Gregory-Barlow Place, Mooresville, Kentucky, (NRHP) in Washington County
 Peter Gregory House, Union, Kentucky, (NRHP) in Boone County
 Richard and Mary Woodward Gregory House, Augusta, Michigan, (NRHP) in Kalamazoo County
 Gregory House (Poughkeepsie, New York), (NRHP) in Dutchess County
 Gregory House (New London, Ohio), (NRHP) in Huron County
 Paulson-Gregory House, Newberg, Oregon, (NRHP) in Yamhill County